Johan Christen Løken (27 July 1944 – 18 December 2017) was a Norwegian politician for the Conservative Party. He was Minister of Agriculture from 1981 to 1983, as a Member of Parliament until 1993. He also served as the Leader of the Hedmark Conservatives from 1976 to 1982.

References

1944 births
2017 deaths
Ministers of Agriculture and Food of Norway
Members of the Storting
Conservative Party (Norway) politicians
20th-century Norwegian politicians
Hedmark politicians